This is a list of species in the genus Plateros.

Plateros species

 Plateros arizonensis Green, 1953
 Plateros australis Green, 1953
 Plateros avians Green, 1953
 Plateros batillifer Green, 1953
 Plateros bidens Green, 1953
 Plateros bispiculatus Green, 1953
 Plateros borealis Green, 1953
 Plateros capillaris Green, 1953
 Plateros capitatus Green, 1953
 Plateros carinulatus Green, 1953
 Plateros centralis Green, 1953
 Plateros coccinicollis Fall, 1910
 Plateros devians Green, 1953
 Plateros flavoscutellatus Blatchley, 1914
 Plateros floralis (Melsheimer, 1845)
 Plateros knulli Green, 1953
 Plateros lictor (Newman, 1838)
 Plateros modestus (Say, 1835)
 Plateros nigerrimus Schaeffer, 1908
 Plateros nigrior Green, 1953
 Plateros ocularis Green, 1953
 Plateros perditus Green, 1953
 Plateros peregrinus Green, 1953
 Plateros roseimargo Fall, 1910
 Plateros sanguinicollis Horn, 1894
 Plateros sollicitus (LeConte, 1847)
 Plateros subfurcatus Green, 1953
 Plateros subtortus Green, 1953
 Plateros timidus (LeConte, 1847)
 Plateros transpictus Green, 1953
 Plateros tumacacori Green, 1953
 Plateros volatus Green, 1953

References